Acidic leucine-rich nuclear phosphoprotein 32 family member B (ANP32B) also known as "acidic protein rich in leucines" (APRIL) is a protein that in humans is encoded by the ANP32B gene.

APRIL is also the acronym used for an entirely different protein, TNFSF13, a member of the tumor necrosis factor superfamily whose alternative name, A PRoliferation Inducing Ligand, shares the same acronym as that for ANP32B

See also
 ANP32A, ANP32C, ANP32D, ANP32E

References

External links

Further reading